The German Rugby Union Cup (German: DRV-Pokal) is the premier cup competition for men in the sport of Rugby Union in Germany.

In October 2009, it was proposed to discontinue both men's cup competitions after 2010, meaning, both the DRV-Pokal and the league cup were not to be played anymore after this season. However, this proposal was initially  not carried out but neither competition was held in 2011–12. The DRV-Pokal however returned in 2012–13, now contested by the Bundesliga teams not qualified for the second round of the season and the best 2nd Bundesliga teams.

History
The DRV-Pokal was established in 1962 under the guidance of the chairman of the DRV, Heinz Reinhold. Originally, the trophy for the winner was a picture of the Brandenburg Gate, an important symbol of the cold war days in Germany.

In October 2010, the board of the German rugby federation proposed to discontinue both cup competitions after 2010. This decision required formal approval at the annual conference of the DRV, which was not granted.

Modus
In 2008-09, 16 teams took part in the final rounds of the competition, played in knock-out format. The games are played as single rounds with one club having the home advantage. The final was played on 1 May 2008.

In 2010-11, the competition was played in a different format, with four teams playing a final-four tournament in October 2010.

While not held in 2011–12 the competition returned in 2012–13, now contested between the worst-placed six Bundesliga teams after the first stage of the regular season and the best eight 2nd Bundesliga clubs.

After another league reform in 2015 the DRV-Pokal will now be contested by the Rugby-Bundesliga teams not qualified for the German championship, meaning the teams placed third to eighth in each of the two regional divisions.

2016–17 DRV-Pokal

The first round:

The quarter finals:

2015–16 DRV-Pokal

The remaining twelve Bundesliga clubs not qualified for the championship play-off entered the DRV-Pokal, the premier rugby union cup competition in Germany. The teams placed third and fourth received a bye for the first round:

The first round saw the teams placed fifth to eighth drawn against each other:

For the quarter finals teams were not seeded, with the clubs placed third and fourth entering the competition. The quarter finals were scheduled for 4 and 5 June, the semi finals for 11 and 12 June and the final for 26 June:

Cup finals
The finals of the competition:

Source:
 1 Victoria declined to take part in a rematch after a 0–0 score after extra time.

Winners
As of 2016, this is the standing in the all–time winners list of the German cup:

References

External links
 DRV website  German rugby federation website

Cup
1962 establishments in West Germany